Gymnoamblyopus novaeguineae is a species of freshwater goby endemic to Papua New Guinea.  This species grows to a length of  SL.  This species is the only known member of its genus.

References

Amblyopinae
Monotypic fish genera
Fish described in 2003
Endemic fauna of Papua New Guinea